Zangay-i Shavaran is an Iranian hero at the time of Kay Khosrow. His fame is in relation to  Wife Siyavash Jawira. After Siyâvash death, Iranians did not know about Siyavash family in Turan. Only two Iranians knew of Siavash and Jawira marriage, and Zangay-i Shavaran and Bahram were both.

The story of Zangeh
In Kay Khosrow first attack on Turan,  was commander of the Tous Corps, and he moved the Corps out of Farud territory. And Farud was the Keikhosro vector but the governor of Afrasiab. When Charam was surrounded by Iranians at the center of the Farud government, Farud came to his mother Javiera. And he told his mother how to identify myself with the Iranians. His mother said: Search two people inside the Iranian army, one is Zangay-i Shavaran and the other is Bahram. And so Zangay-i Shavaran enters the literature of Iran-Turan war.

References

Sources
Ferdowsi Shahnameh. From the Moscow version. Mohammed Publishing.

External links

Shahnameh characters
Shahnameh stories